Nireaha Tamaki  (born c. 1835–37; died 1911) was a New Zealand Māori leader from the Rangitāne and Ngāti Kahungunu iwi (tribes).

References

Year of birth uncertain
1911 deaths
Rangitāne people
Ngāti Kahungunu people